Ernest Platt Buffett (February 3, 1877 – September 22, 1946) was an American businessman and grocer. He was the father of U.S. Congressman Howard Buffett and grandfather of Warren Buffett, the American billionaire businessman and investor.

Early life 
Ernest Buffett was born in Dix Hills, New York on February 3, 1877 to Sidney Homan Buffett (1848–1927) and Eveline Ketcham Buffett (1850–1886). Buffett's parents were second cousins, both having mainly English descent. The Buffet surname (renamed to Buffett) originates in France with a Huguenot weaver, named John Buffett, who became Buffett's first American Buffett ancestor when he immigrated to New York in the late-1600s. 

Buffett attended Omaha High School.

Career 
After graduation from high school, he worked at his father's "Buffett & Son" grocery from 1895 to 1915, becoming the owner and operator of its new downtown branch location in 1915. He employed his grandson Warren at the grocery store when he was in high school.

Buffett gained local and national recognition for his innovation in the grocery industry for the first decades of the 20th century. He founded a retail cooperative organization known as "Buy-Rite" which allowed smaller, family-owned grocers to compete with the larger chain supermarkets and stores through cooperative purchasing and advertising. 

In 1902, Buffett became the president of the Omaha Retail Grocers Association and later was the president of the Nebraska Retail Grocers Association. He also was an active member of the National Retail Grocers Association. Buffett was a member of the local chamber of commerce, rotary club, Boy Scouts of America council, and served for a period as president of the Nebraska Humane Society. 

Buffett was an astute businessman who was known to be frugal, strict, and conservative. In 1939, he wrote, "there has never been a Buffett who ever left a very large estate, but there has never been one that did not leave something. They never spent all they made, but always saved part of what they made, and it has all worked out pretty well."

Personal life 
Buffett married Henrietta Duvall on March 21, 1898. They had 5 children, including Howard Buffett, a four-term member of the United States House of Representatives (1903–1964). Buffett is the grandfather of Warren Buffett, a businessman, investor, philanthropist, and Chairman & CEO of Berkshire Hathaway. After Henrietta's death in 1921, Buffett married Belle Bailey in 1922. 

The Buffetts were active members of Dundee Presbyterian Church in Omaha. 

Buffett was writing an unfinished book titled, “How to Run a Grocery Store and a Few Things I Have Learned About Fishing.”

Death 
Buffett died on September 22, 1946 at the age of 69 in Omaha. He is buried at Prospect Hill Cemetery.

References 

1877 births
1946 deaths
20th-century American businesspeople
20th-century Presbyterians
American grocers
American people of English descent
American people of Scandinavian descent
American Presbyterians
Buffett family
Businesspeople from Omaha, Nebraska
Nebraska Republicans